494th may refer to:

494th Bombardment Squadron, inactive United States Air Force unit
494th Bombardment Wing, inactive United States Air Force unit
494th Fighter Squadron (494 FS), part of the 48th Fighter Wing at RAF Lakenheath, England

See also
494 (number)
494 (disambiguation)
494, the year 494 (CDXCIV) of the Julian calendar
494 BC